Diego Rigonato Rodrigues (born 9 March 1988), commonly known as Diego, is a Brazilian professional footballer who plays as a left-back and midfielder for Ceará.

Club career

Budapest Honved
Diego made his debut of 27 November 2006 against Vasas SC in a match that ended 1–0.

Reims
Diego helped Stade de Reims win the 2017–18 Ligue 2, helping promote them to the Ligue 1 for the 2018–19 season.

Toluca
Diego was presented as Toluca's new signing on 25 July 2019.

Career statistics

Honours
Honvéd
 Hungarian Cup: 2008–09
 Hungarian Cup runners-up: 2007–08
 Hungarian Super Cup runners-up: 2007, 2009

Reims
 Ligue 2: 2017–18

References

External links

Player profile at HLSZ

1988 births
Living people
People from Americana, São Paulo
Brazilian footballers
Association football midfielders
Brazilian expatriate footballers
Expatriate footballers in Hungary
Budapest Honvéd FC players
Brazilian expatriate sportspeople in Hungary
Expatriate footballers in France
Tours FC players
Stade de Reims players
Al Dhafra FC players
Deportivo Toluca F.C. players
Ceará Sporting Club players
Nemzeti Bajnokság I players
Nemzeti Bajnokság II players
Ligue 2 players
Ligue 1 players
Championnat National 3 players
UAE Pro League players
Liga MX players
Campeonato Brasileiro Série A players
Brazilian expatriate sportspeople in France
Brazilian expatriate sportspeople in the United Arab Emirates
Expatriate footballers in the United Arab Emirates
Brazilian expatriate sportspeople in Mexico
Expatriate footballers in Mexico
Footballers from São Paulo (state)